Adventure Class Ships, Vol. I is a tabletop role-playing game supplement, written by Jordan Weisman, with a cover by William H. Keith, for Traveller, and published by FASA in 1981.

Contents
Adventure Class Ships, Vol. I is a set of 15mm scale deck plans with sheets for ten different Imperial, Zhodani and independent vessels, with an accompanying identification booklet of ship stats and descriptions, plus smaller scale plans of four auxiliary vessels.

Publication history
Adventure Class Ships, Vol. I was written by Jordan Weisman, Craig Johnson, Scott Walschlager, and Ross Babcock, and was published in 1981 by FASA as a boxed set containing a 16-page pamphlet, and five large double-sided map sheets.

Reception
William A. Barton reviewed Adventure Class Ships, Vol. I in The Space Gamer No. 49. Barton commented that "Overall, Adventure Class Ships, Vol. I proves an excellent play aid for Traveller and is recommended fully."

Reviews
 Different Worlds #19 (Feb., 1982)

References

Role-playing game supplements introduced in 1981
Traveller (role-playing game) supplements